Pavitra: Bharose Ka Safar is an Indian television drama series that premiered from 14 September 2021 on Azaad TV. Produced by Santosh Singh, Rochelle Singh and Pearl Grey under Parth Production, it stars Sheezan Mohammed Khan and Shaily Priya Pandey. It went off air on 9 April 2022 and digitally available on MX Player.

Plot

Cast  
 Sheezan Mohammed Khan as Aarya Thakur
 Shaily Priya Pandey as Pavitra
 Neelu Vaghela as Uma Thakur
 Kumaar Raajput as Bade Thakur
 Siddhi Sharma as Rachna Thakur
 Shiwani Chakraborty as Rekha Thakur
 Hemant Choudhary as Pawan - Pavitra’s Father
 Dipali Kamath as Laxmi
 Shubham Bagwe as Akash
 Sonia Keswaani as Kavita
 Siddharth Ohri as Vishal Thakur
 Priyansh as Rohan Thakur

Production 
The series was announced in 2021 by Azaad TV. The teaser of the series was released on 14 September 2021. Shaily Priya Pandey was cast in the titular role, and was joined by Sheezan Mohammed Khan as leads.

References

External links
 
 Pavitra Bharose Ka Safar on MX Player

Hindi-language television shows
Indian television soap operas
2021 Indian television series debuts
2022 Indian television series endings